Duncan Hamilton may refer to:
 Duncan Hamilton (politician) (born 1973), former Scottish National Party MSP
 Duncan Hamilton (racing driver) (1920–1994), winner of Le Mans 24 hours race
 Duncan Hamilton (journalist), winner of the 2007 William Hill Sports Book of the Year